Jacob Carstensen (born 10 September 1978 in Kastrup, Tårnby) is a former freestyle swimmer from Denmark, who competed in three consequentive Summer Olympics for his native country, starting in 1996. He won the world title in the 400m Freestyle at the 1997 FINA Short Course World Championships (25m) in Gothenburg.

References

1978 births
Living people
Danish male medley swimmers
Danish male freestyle swimmers
Swimmers at the 1996 Summer Olympics
Swimmers at the 2000 Summer Olympics
Swimmers at the 2004 Summer Olympics
Olympic swimmers of Denmark
People from Tårnby Municipality
Medalists at the FINA World Swimming Championships (25 m)
Sportspeople from the Capital Region of Denmark